Thiessow is a village and a former municipality in the Vorpommern-Rügen district, in Mecklenburg-Vorpommern, Germany. Since January 2018, it is part of the new municipality Mönchgut. Besides Thiessow, the municipality included the village Klein Zicker.

References

External links

Official website of Thiessow (German)
Thiessow on ruegen.de (English)

Towns and villages on Rügen
Mönchgut
Former municipalities in Mecklenburg-Western Pomerania